Thomas Kirk may refer to:

 Thomas Kirk (artist) (1765–1797), English artist, book illustrator and engraver
 Thomas Kirk (botanist) (1828–1898), English-born botanist, writer and churchman in New Zealand
 Tom Kirk (cricketer) (born 1992), cricketer who plays for Guernsey
 Thomas William Kirk (1856–1936), biologist and scientific administrator from New Zealand
 Thomas Kirk (sculptor) (1781–1845), Irish sculptor
 Thomas Stewart Kirk (1848–1879), Irish sculptor
 Thomas Andrew Murray Kirk (1906–1966), Canadian Member of Parliament, 1949–1958
 Thomas James Kirk, American convicted fraudster
TJ Kirk (Thomas James Kirk III, born 1985), American YouTube personality and author
 Thomas Henry Kirk (1873–1940), Canadian politician in the Legislative Assembly of British Columbia

See also
 Tom Kirk (disambiguation)
 Tommy Kirk (1941–2021), American actor